Granville George Waldegrave, 4th Baron Radstock, CBE (1 September 1859 – 2 April 1937) was a baron in the Peerage of Ireland.

Biography
Radstock was the eldest son of Granville Waldegrave, 3rd Baron Radstock and his wife, Susan Charlotte Calcroft. He was educated at Repton School and graduated from Trinity College, Cambridge with a BA degree.

Radstock succeeded to the barony upon the death of his father on 8 December 1913.

Honours
Radstock was invested as a Commander of the Order of the British Empire (CBE).

Death
Lord Radstock died on 2 April 1937, aged 77. He was unmarried and was succeeded in the peerage by his younger brother Montague Waldegrave, 5th Baron Radstock.

Arms

References

thepeerage.com

1859 births
1937 deaths
People educated at Repton School
Alumni of Trinity College, Cambridge
Barons in the Peerage of Ireland
Waldegrave family
Commanders of the Order of the British Empire